Duets is an album by guitarists Jimmy Raney and Doug Raney recorded in 1979 and released on the Danish label, SteepleChase.

Reception 

Scott Yanow of AllMusic states "Although Doug (then 22) was clearly influenced by his father, he had also listened closely to Tal Farlow and Jim Hall; with practice, listeners should be able to tell the Raneys apart".

Track listing 
 "Have You Met Miss Jones?" (Richard Rodgers) – 4:06
 "My One and Only Love" (Guy Wood, Robert Mellin) – 5:26
 "Action" (Jimmy Raney) – 5:13
 "Invitation" (Bronisław Kaper ) – 6:35
 "It Might as Well Be Spring" (Rodgers) – 5:18
 "Days of Wine and Roses" (Henry Mancini) – 5:26
 "Oleo" (Sonny Rollins) – 4:22
 "My Funny Valentine" (Rodgers) – 6:23

Personnel 
Jimmy Raney, Doug Raney – guitar

References 

Doug Raney albums
Jimmy Raney albums
1980 albums
SteepleChase Records albums